Uttarahalli is an area of Bangalore in the Indian state of Karnataka

Demographics
 India census, Uttarahalli had a population of 10,467.  Males constitute 52% of the population and females 48%. Uttarahalli has an average literacy rate of 67%, higher than the national average of 59.5%: male literacy is 73%, and female literacy is 61%. In Uttarahalli, 13% of the population is under 6 years of age. It was India's largest electoral constituency. One of the prominent areas of Uttarahalli is Subramanyapura.

References

Neighbourhoods in Bangalore